The Wolf- or Fret-class destroyers, also known as the Roofdier class, lit. "predator", were a class of eight destroyers that were built between 1910 and 1913 for the Royal Netherlands Navy to serve in the Dutch East Indies. They were the first Dutch destroyers built after a British design. The first six ships were built by Koninklijke Schelde Groep De Schelde shipyards in Vlissingen, and the last two by Fijenoord in Rotterdam.

Design
The ships displaced  and measured  in length overall,  in breadth, with a  draught. They were powered by four Yarrow boilers installed creating steam that produced . They had two Krupp-Germania steam turbines that drove two shafts. This gave the last four ships an additional  of endurance.

The ships were armed with four /52-calibre guns, four /80-calibre machine guns, and two  torpedo tubes.

Ships

They are named after mammals of the order Carnivora (Roofdieren is a synonym for carnivore in Dutch). Their names in English, in the sequence listed, mean: wolf, ferret, bulldog, jackal, ermine, lynx, fox and panther.

Notes

Citations

References
 

 
Destroyers of the Royal Netherlands Navy
Destroyer classes